Thomas Mitchell Richardson (August 7, 1883 – November 15, 1939) was an American Major League Baseball player who pinch hit for the St. Louis Browns on August 2, . He went 0–1.

External links
Baseball Reference.com

1883 births
1939 deaths
St. Louis Browns players
Baseball players from Illinois
People from Louisville, Illinois